Camera! The Digest of the Motion Picture Industry was an American film industry trade paper from 1918 to 1924. Camera! is notable as "the film industry’s first weekly trade paper to consistently publish from Los Angeles." The publication also took strong stances against "what it perceived as detrimental forces in the industry, notably, the rampant 'fake' schools of acting, and the newly formed Motion Picture Producers and Distributors of America and its first president Will Hays."

Unlike some entertainment industry periodicals of the day, Camera! only covered cinema, not legitimate theater or vaudeville. The Camera! offices were adjacent to the Photoplayers' Equity Association.

References

External links

 Media History Digital Library: Camera! April 1919-April 1920

1918 establishments in California
Film magazines published in the United States
Entertainment trade magazines
Magazines established in 1918
Magazines published in Los Angeles
1924 disestablishments in California
Magazines disestablished in 1924
Defunct magazines published in the United States
Weekly magazines published in the United States